The 2020 Nicky Rackard Cup Final was played at Croke Park in Dublin on 22 November 2020. It was contested by Donegal and Mayo.

Donegal won the competition for a third time, becoming the first team to achieve this.

Mickey McCann was manager. Seán McVeigh was captain. However, the 2020 win did not secure passage back to the 2021 Christy Ring Cup for Donegal, a condition that was not made clear until shortly before the final.

Match details

Notes

References

Nicky Rackard Cup Final
Nicky Rackard Cup
Donegal county hurling team matches
Mayo county hurling team matches
Nicky Rackard Cup Finals